4,4′-(Hexafluoroisopropylidene)diphthalic anhydride (6FDA) is an aromatic organofluorine compound and the dianhydride of 4,4′-(hexafluoroisopropylidene)bisphthalic acid (name derived from phthalic acid).

Synthesis 
The raw materials for 6FDA are hexafluoroacetone and orthoxylene. With hydrogen fluoride as a catalyst, the compounds react to 4,4′-(hexafluoroisopropylidene)bis(o-xylene). This is oxidized with potassium permanganate to 4,4′-(hexafluoroisopropylidene)bisphthalic acid. Dehydration gives the dianhydride 6FDA.

Applications 
6FDA is used as monomer for the synthesis of fluorinated polyimides. These are prepared by the polymerisation of 6FDA with an aromatic diamine such as 3,5-diaminobenzoic acid or 4,4'-diaminodiphenyl sulfide. Such fluorinated polyimides are used in special applications, e. g. used to make gas-permeable polymer membranes, in the field of microelectronics and optics, such as optical lenses from polymers, OLEDs, or high-performance CMOS-contact image sensors (CISs).

These polyimides are typically soluble in common organic solvents, facilitating their production and processing. They have very low water absorption, which makes them particularly suitable for special optical applications.

References

Monomers
Carboxylic anhydrides
Trifluoromethyl compounds